Edwin Roberto Villatoro Acevedo (born 18 February 1980 in Guatemala City) is a Guatemalan football forward who currently plays for Segunda Division club Chiquimulilla.

Club career
Villatoro started his career at Suchitepéquez and has also had two spells at local giants CSD Municipal.

International career
Villatoro made his debut for Guatemala in a January 2005 friendly match against Colombia and has, as of January 2010, earned a total of 27 caps, scoring 5 goals. He has represented his country in 4 FIFA World Cup qualification matches and played two matches at the 2005 CONCACAF Gold Cup. He played in five matches at the UNCAF Nations Cup 2005, where he scored three goals.

Career statistics

International goals
Scores and results list. Guatemala's goal tally first.

References

External links
 

1980 births
Living people
Sportspeople from Guatemala City
Association football forwards
Guatemalan footballers
Guatemala international footballers
2005 UNCAF Nations Cup players
2005 CONCACAF Gold Cup players
2007 UNCAF Nations Cup players
2007 CONCACAF Gold Cup players
2009 UNCAF Nations Cup players
C.D. Suchitepéquez players
C.S.D. Municipal players